The Shadow Attorney General for England and Wales is an office within British politics held by a member of His Majesty's Loyal Opposition. The duty of the office holder is to scrutinise the actions of the Attorney General for England and Wales and develop alternative policies. The Shadow Attorney General is not a member of the Shadow Cabinet, but attends its meetings.

The Shadow Attorney General is deputised by the Shadow Solicitor General.

List of Shadow Attorneys General

References

Official Opposition (United Kingdom)